Boriana Stoyanova (born November 3, 1969) is a retired Bulgarian artistic gymnast. She was the 1983 World Champion on the vault and represented Bulgaria at the 1984 Friendship Games (Oloumouc) and the 1988 Olympics in Seoul.  She was also a member of the 1985 and 1987 teams that competed at the World Championships.

Competitive history

References

External links
 
 
 

1969 births
Living people
Bulgarian female artistic gymnasts
World champion gymnasts
Medalists at the World Artistic Gymnastics Championships
Gymnasts at the 1988 Summer Olympics
Olympic gymnasts of Bulgaria